Sebastian Ertelt is an American politician.

Ertelt received a Bachelor of Science in mechanical engineering from North Dakota State University and an MBA from the University of Mary. In 2016 he was elected to represent the 26th district in the North Dakota House of Representatives with Representative Kathy Skroch. They defeated the Democratic incumbents Bill Amerman and Jerry Kelsh in the 2016 election after having previously lost to them in 2012.

He is a member of the North Dakota Republican Party.

References

Republican Party members of the North Dakota House of Representatives
North Dakota State University alumni
University of Mary alumni
Living people
Year of birth missing (living people)
21st-century American politicians